The 1999–2000 season was the 68th in the history of Real Zaragoza and their 22nd consecutive season in the second division. The club participated in the La Liga and the Copa del Rey.

Players

Transfers

Competitions

Overall record

La Liga

League table

Results summary

Results by round

Matches

Copa del Rey

First round

Second round

Round of 16

Statistics

Players statistics

References 

Real Zaragoza seasons
Zaragoza